This is a list of recordings of Norma, a two-act opera by Vincenzo Bellini with an Italian-language libretto by Felice Romani. It was first performed on 26 December 1831, at La Scala in Milan.

Note: "Cat:" is short for catalogue number by the label company.

References

Sources
 Recordings of Norma on operadis-opera-discography.org.uk

Opera discographies